Wangkhei is one of the 60 Legislative Assembly constituencies of Manipur state in India.

It is part of Imphal East district.

Birth and extent of the constituency
Wangkhei was created for the first legislative assembly election in Manipur, in 1967. As of the latest delimitation in 2007, it comprises Ward Nos. 21, 22, 23 and 26 in Imphal municipality.

Members of the Legislative Assembly

Election results

2017 
Okram Henry Singh was declared as the winner in 2017, but on 15 April 2021, the Manipur High Court declared the election result as null and void. It also declared that Yumkham Erabot Singh was the MLA of the Wangkhei constituency.

See also
 List of constituencies of the Manipur Legislative Assembly
 Imphal East district

References

External links
 

Imphal East district
Assembly constituencies of Manipur